Herbiconiux solani is a bacterium from the genus of Herbiconiux which has been isolated from the phyllosphere of a potato plant from Dahnsdorf in Germany.

References

Microbacteriaceae
Bacteria described in 2011